François Bourassa (June 5, 1813 – May 13, 1898) was a Quebec farmer and political figure. He represented Saint-Jean in the House of Commons of Canada as a Liberal member from 1867 to 1896.

He was born in Sainte-Marguerite-de-Blairfindie, Lower Canada in 1813. His father, also named François, was the first mayor of the town. He took part in the Lower Canada Rebellion, was arrested but later released and later served as captain in the local militia. He settled at Saint-Jean and represented the town on the council for Chambly County. In 1854, he was elected to the Legislative Assembly of the Province of Canada for Saint-Jean as a member of the parti rouge; he served under the Canadian Confederation, when he was elected to the federal parliament, although he opposed confederation. Bourassa spoke no English. He retired from politics in 1896. He served as mayor of l'Acadie in 1858.

He died in Saint-Valentin in 1898.

His brother Napoléon was a Quebec painter, writer, sculptor and architect and his nephew Henri Bourassa served in the Legislative Assembly of Quebec and the House of Commons.

Electoral record

External links
 

 

1813 births
1898 deaths
Members of the Legislative Assembly of the Province of Canada from Canada East
Liberal Party of Canada MPs
Members of the House of Commons of Canada from Quebec
Mayors of places in Quebec